Shegaftik, also rendered as Shekaftik, may refer to:
 Shegaftik-e Olya
 Shegaftik-e Sofla